Lake Arthur is a lake in Quebec, in Port-Cartier–Sept-Îles Wildlife Reserve in the Côte-Nord region.

Location

It is in the unorganized territory of Lac-Walker, in the Sept-Rivières Regional County Municipality of the Côte-Nord administrative region, Quebec.
It is just east of Grand lac Caotibi, into which it drains. This lake in turns drains to the north into Petit lac Caotibi, which feeds the Rivière Toulnustouc Nord-Est (North-East Toulnustouc River), a tributary of Lake Caron in the Toulnustouc River basin.
The Cartier Railway runs between Lake Arthur and Grand lac Caotibi.

It is one of the attractions of Port-Cartier–Sept-Îles Wildlife Reserve.
The lake is known for having many large brook trout.

Name

Lake Arthur is named after Arthur A. Schmon (1895–1964) of Newark, New Jersey, a leading figure in the paper industry.
It was given this name on 5 December 1968.

Ecology

A map of the Ecological regions of Quebec places the lake in the 6J-S ecological subregion, part of the eastern spruce/moss domain of the boreal zone.

Visiting

A campsite operated by the reserve is accessible from the road that runs along the south of the lake.
There is no drinking water, but there are showers, cottage accommodation and boat rental.
There are 29 camping sites.
The reserve charges a daily fee for use of the site.
On 19 December 2017 the Quebec government announced that a fifth Modik cottage was being built at Lake Arthur at a cost of $247,000.
The wooden cottage would have capacity for four adults, and was designed for fishing enthusiasts.
Most of the energy would be solar.

Notes

Sources

External link
 Other lakes in Quebec named Lac Arthur

Lakes of Côte-Nord